The 2008 South Carolina Republican presidential primary was held on January 19, with 24 delegates at stake. The Republican National Committee took half of South Carolina's 47 delegates away from them because the state committee moved its Republican primary before February 5. It was held on the same day as the Nevada Republican caucuses, 2008.

The primary has become one of several key early state nominating contests in the process of choosing the nominee of the Republican party for the November 2008 election for President of the United States. It has historically been more important for the Republican Party than for the Democratic Party; from its inception in 1980 through the election of 2000, the winner of the Republican presidential primary has gone  on to win the nomination.  As of 2008, the primary has cemented its place as the "First in the South" primary for both parties.

This state's 24 delegates would be awarded on a  "Winner-Takes-All" basis.  12 Delegates for the Statewide winner and 12 delegates awarded on a District-winner basis awarding 2 delegates for each of the states then 6 Congressional districts.

Polling

As of January 19, RealClearPolitics reported that the average support from polls placed McCain in the lead with 26.9%, followed by Huckabee with 25.9%, Romney with 14.7%, Thompson with 14.6%, Paul with 4.4%, and Giuliani with 3.4%.

Results
Huckabee was for weeks leading in the state but lost by a 14,743 vote margin.  He did manage to win Congressional districts 3, 4 and 5 in the North of the state earning him a total of 6 delegates.

John McCain won the statewide primary earning him 12 Delegates as well as Congressional Districts 1, 2 and 6. earning him an additional 6 delegates for a total of 18.

* Candidate withdrew his bid for the nomination prior to the reporting of the primary.
On January 22, 2008 after a poor showing Fred Thompson dropped out of the race. Duncan Hunter did so too.

Results of prior primaries
1980: Ronald Reagan won with 54%, defeating runner-up John Connally.
1984: Uncontested (Reagan was the incumbent president and was re-nominated).
1988: George H. W. Bush won with 49%, defeating runner-up Bob Dole.
1992: George H. W. Bush won with 68%, defeating runner-up Pat Buchanan.
1996: Bob Dole won with 45%, defeating runner-up Pat Buchanan.
2000: George W. Bush won with 53%, defeating runner-up John McCain.
2004: Uncontested (Bush was the incumbent president and was re-nominated).

See also
 Republican Party (United States) presidential primaries, 2008
 South Carolina primary
 South Carolina Democratic primary, 2008

References

External links
Election Center 2008:Primary Results for South Carolina
South Carolina GOP Presidential Primary Task Force
2008 South Carolina Primary

South Carolina
2008 South Carolina elections
2008